Manuel Álvarez may refer to:

Manny Alvarez (born 1957), Cuban-American ob-gyn
Manuel Álvarez (sprinter) (1910–?), Mexican sprinter who competed in the 1932 Summer Olympics
Manuel Álvarez (trader) (1794–1856), Trader and later politician in Santa Fe, New Mexico
Manuel Álvarez Bravo (1902–2002), Mexican photographer
Manuel Álvarez Jiménez (1928–1998), Chile football defender who played for Chile in the 1950 FIFA World Cup
José Manuel Álvarez, Governor of Córdoba, Argentina, 1901–1904
Juan Manuel Álvarez (born 1979), Californian convicted of causing the 2005 Glendale train crash